Blepephaeus mindanaonis is a species of beetle in the family Cerambycidae. It was described by Schultze in 1920, originally under the genus Pharsalia. It is known from the Philippines.

References

Blepephaeus
Beetles described in 1920